Jaime Lee Bubela (born June 6, 1978 in Houston, Texas) is a former Major League Baseball outfielder who played one season for the Seattle Mariners.

Amateur career
Bubela attended Baylor University. In 1999, he played collegiate summer baseball with the Wareham Gatemen of the Cape Cod Baseball League, where he was named a league all-star and won the league's Thurman Munson Award for leading all hitters with a .370 batting average. He was drafted in the 7th round of the 2000 Major League Baseball Draft by the Seattle Mariners.

Professional career
In , he batted .292 and stole 40 bases for Double-A San Antonio. This earned him a September call up, and he made his major league debut on September 15, 2005. He played his final major league game on October 2, 2005.

References

External links
Baseball-Reference

1978 births
Living people
Seattle Mariners players
Baseball players from Houston
Blinn Buccaneers baseball players
Major League Baseball outfielders
Lancaster JetHawks players
Everett AquaSox players
Wisconsin Timber Rattlers players
San Bernardino Stampede players
San Antonio Missions players
Arizona League Mariners players
Peoria Javelinas players
Wareham Gatemen players